Isabelle is a French feminine given name.

Isabelle may also refer to:

People
 Isabelle (singer) (born 1981), Dominican singer
  Isabelle of Bavaria (1370–1435), wife of King Charles VI of France
 Isabelle de Charrière (1740–1805), Dutch and Swiss writer of the Enlightenment
 Isabelle de Borchgrave (born 1946), Belgian artist and sculptor
 Isabelle of England (1295–1358), wife of Edward II of England and regent of England from 1327 to 1330
 Isabelle of France (saint) (1225–1270)
 Isabelle de Limeuil (1535–1609), French noblewoman and maid of honour to Queen Mother Catherine de' Medici
 Isabelle of Luxembourg (1247–1298), countess consort of Flanders and marquis consort of Namur
 Isabelle d'Orleans, Madame de Guise (1646–1696), Duchess of Alençon and Duchess of Angoulême
 Gaston Isabelle (born 1920), Canadian politician
 Pierre Isabelle, Canadian scientist
 Princess Isabelle (disambiguation)
 Queen Isabelle (disambiguation)

Places
 Isabelle Peak, a peak on the Continental Divide in the Canadian Rockies
 Isabelle, Wisconsin, United States, a town
 Lake Isabelle, a lake in Minnesota, United States

Other
 ISABELLE, a partially-built particle accelerator at Brookhaven National Laboratory in Upton, New York, cancelled in July 1983
 Isabelle (Animal Crossing), a fictional character in the Animal Crossing video game series
 Isabelle (comics), a Belgian comic series
 Isabelle (film), a Canadian-American horror film
 Isabelle (Marvel Comics), a character in Marvel Comics
 Isabelle (novella), a 1911 novella by André Gide
 Isabelle (proof assistant), an interactive theorem-proving framework
 MS Isabelle, a cruiseferry owned and operated by Estonia-based Tallink
 Isabelle's ghost bat (Diclidurus isabellus), a bat species from South America

See also
 Isabelle of Orléans (disambiguation)
 
 Isabel (disambiguation)
 Isabella (disambiguation)